Augusto Fiorentini (16 June 1929 – 10 August 2010) was an Italian weightlifter. He competed in the men's light heavyweight event at the 1952 Summer Olympics.

References

External links
 

1929 births
2010 deaths
Italian male weightlifters
Olympic weightlifters of Italy
Weightlifters at the 1952 Summer Olympics
Sportspeople from Ferrara
20th-century Italian people